Sivapalan is a Tamil male given name. Due to the Tamil tradition of using patronymic surnames it may also be a surname for males and females.

Notable people

Given name
 M. Sivapalan (born 1953), Sri Lankan engineer, hydrologist and academic
 Pon Sivapalan (c1952–1998), Sri Lankan politician
 S. Sivapalan (c1890–1960), Ceylonese politician

See also
 

Tamil masculine given names